Magnus "Mike" Goodman (18 March 1898 – 18 July 1991) was an Icelandic-Canadian athlete. He was a member of the Winnipeg Falcons ice hockey team, who represented Canada at the 1920 Summer Olympics and won the gold medal.

Life
Goodman was born in 1898 to Icelandic immigrant Gísli Guðmundsson and Ólöf Björnsdóttir. He distinguished himself in ice hockey as well as swimming and speed skating. As a young man he joined the Winnipeg Falcons, an amateur hockey team largely made up of Icelanders excluded from Winnipeg's other teams. His position was left wing. In 1920 the team won the Allan Cup and the right to represent Canada at the 1920 Summer Olympics, the first Olympic Games to feature hockey. The Falcons went on to defeat Sweden to win the gold medal.  Goodman was known to carry his gold medal in his pocket at all times.

In 1938 he served as player-coach for the Coral Gables Seminoles of the Miami-based Tropical Hockey League, an early attempt to establish Hockey in the Southern United States. He died in Miami in 1991 at the age of 93, the last surviving member of the Winnipeg Falcons.

Awards and achievements
Allan Cup Championship (1920)
Olympic Gold Medalist (1920)
AHA Championships (1927 & 1934)
"Honoured Member" of the Manitoba Hockey Hall of Fame

Career statistics

Regular season and playoffs

International

Head coaching record

References

External links
 
Mike Goodman's biography at databaseOlympics.com
Falcons

1898 births
1991 deaths
Canadian expatriates in the United States
Canadian ice hockey left wingers
Canadian male speed skaters
Canadian male swimmers
Canadian people of Icelandic descent
Ice hockey people from Manitoba
Ice hockey players at the 1920 Summer Olympics
Medalists at the 1920 Summer Olympics
Olympic gold medalists for Canada
Olympic ice hockey players of Canada
Olympic medalists in ice hockey
Speed skaters from Winnipeg
Winnipeg Falcons players